Collage film is a style of film created by juxtaposing found footage from disparate sources (archival footage, excerpts from other films, newsreels, home movies, etc.) The term has also been applied to the physical collaging of materials onto film stock.

Surrealist roots
The surrealist movement played a critical role in the creation of the collage film form. In 1936, the American artist Joseph Cornell produced one of the earliest collage films with his reassembly of East of Borneo (1931), combined with pieces of other films, into a new work he titled Rose Hobart after the leading actress. When Salvador Dalí saw the film, he was famously enraged, believing Cornell had stolen the idea from his thoughts. But Adrian Brunel  made, twelve years before,  Crossing the Great Sagrada (1924) and Henri Storck  conceived, four years earlier,  Story of the Unknown soldier (Histoire du soldat inconnu) (1932).

The idea of combining film from various sources also appealed to another surrealist artist André Breton. In the town of Nantes, he and friend Jacques Vaché would travel from one movie theater to another, without ever staying for an entire film.

Renaissance
A renaissance of found footage films emerged after Bruce Conner's A Movie (1958). The film mixes ephemeral film clips in a dialectical montage. A famous sequence made up of disparate clips shows "a submarine captain [who] seems to see a scantily dressed woman through his periscope and responds by firing a torpedo which produces a nuclear explosion followed by huge waves ridden by surfboard riders." Conner continued to produce several other found footage films including Report and Crossroads among others.

Working at the National Film Board of Canada (NFB) in the 1960s, Arthur Lipsett created collage films such as Very Nice, Very Nice (1961) and 21-87 (1963), entirely composed of found footage discarded during the editing of other films (the former earning an Academy Award nomination).

In 1968, the young Joe Dante made The Movie Orgy with producer Jon Davidson that featured outtakes, trailers and commercials from various shows and films.

Examples since the 1970s
Other notable users of this technique are Chuck Workman with his Oscar-winning Precious Images, Craig Baldwin in his films Spectres of the Spectrum, Tribulation 99 and O No Coronado and Bill Morrison who used found footage lost and neglected in film archives in his 2002 work Decasia (which alongside Kevin Rafferty's 1982 Cold War satire The Atomic Cafe were inducted to the National Film Registry). A similar entry in the found footage canon is Peter Delpeut's Lyrical Nitrate (1991).

The technique was employed in the 2008 feature film The Memories of Angels, a visual ode to Montreal composed of stock footage from over 120 NFB films from the 1950s and 1960s. Terence Davies used a similar technique to create Of Time and the City, recalling his life growing up in Liverpool in the 1950s and 1960s, using newsreel and documentary footage supplemented by his own commentary voiceover and contemporaneous and classical music soundtracks.

The 2016 experimental documentary Fraud (by Dean Fleischer Camp, later known for the Oscar-nominated Marcel the Shell with Shoes On) was sourced from over a hundred hours of home video footage uploaded to YouTube by an unknown family in the United States. The footage was combined with additional clips appropriated from other YouTube users and transformed into a 53-minute crime film about a family preoccupied with material consumption going to extreme lengths in order to get out from under unsustainable personal debt.

Notable collage documentaries

 June 17th, 1994 (2010)
 LA 92 (2017)
 Our Nixon (2013)
 Tarnation (2003)
 Brother, Can You Spare a Dime? (1975)
 Senna (2010)
 Waking Sleeping Beauty (2010)
 Los Angeles Plays Itself (2003)
 Dawson City: Frozen Time (2016)

Comedies
Some of the earliest surrealist collage works were humorous. This tradition of using film collage for comedic effect can later be seen in commercial films such as Woody Allen's first film, What's Up, Tiger Lily? in which Allen took Key of Keys, a Japanese spy film by Senkichi Taniguchi, re-edited parts of it and wrote a new soundtrack made up of his own dialogue for comic effect, and Carl Reiner's 1982 comedy Dead Men Don't Wear Plaid which incorporated footage from approximately two dozen classic film noir films along with original sequences with Steve Martin.

Physical film collaging
Some filmmakers have taken a more literal approach to collage film. Stan Brakhage created films by collaging found objects between clear film stock, then passing the results through an optical printer, such as in Mothlight and The Garden of Earthly Delights.

Animation
Examples of animated collage film (which uses clippings from newspapers, comics and magazines alongside other inanimate objects):
 The Oscar-winning Frank Film (1973) 
 Our Lady of the Sphere (1969)
 The films of Lewis Klahr and Janie Geiser
 Charles Braverman's American Time Capsule (1968)
 Heaven and Earth Magic (1962)
 The works of Stan Vanderbeek and Robert Breer
 The aforementioned Mothlight (1963) and The Garden of Earthly Delights (1981)

References

 
 Film
Documentary film
Documentary_film_genres
Experimental film
Film styles
Modern art
Postmodern art